Kork station is a railway station in Kork, a suburb of Kehl, in southwestern Germany in the Ortenaukreis, Baden-Württemberg. It is on the Appenweier–Strasbourg railway, with trains crossing the Rhine into France to reach the latter destination. Both sides being within the Schengen Area, no passport or border controls apply.

The station opened in 1844. Its two platforms are staggered, rather than being opposite each other, with a level crossing separating them.

TGV services between Paris, Stuttgart and Munich have passed through the station since 2010, albeit at reduced speed. The line also forms part of the Magistrale for Europe initiative, for the creation of a high-speed railway line between Paris and Bratislava, with a branch-off to Budapest.

Services 

Kork is served by regional trains.

References

External links 

 Timetables (SNCF)
 Timetables (Ortenau S-Bahn)

Railway stations in Baden-Württemberg
Railway stations in Germany opened in 1844